Facts and Fictions is the debut album by the British band Asian Dub Foundation and was originally released in 1995, on the Nation Records label. It was later re-released on Virgin France (2000) and Beggars Banquet Records (2002).

Track listing

 "Witness" (Chandrasonic, Aniruddha Das, Pandit G, Steve Chandra Savale, Sun-J, Delbert Tailor, Thorpe, Zaman) – 4:50
 "PKNB" (Chandrasonic, Aniruddha Das, Pandit G, Steve Chandra Savale) – 6:27
 "Jericho" (Chandrasonic, Aniruddha Das, Pandit G, Steve Chandra Savale) – 7:02
 "Rebel Warrior" (Chandrasonic, Aniruddha Das, Pandit G, Steve Chandra Savale) – 6:27
 "Journey" (Chandrasonic, Aniruddha Das, Pandit G, Steve Chandra Savale, Zaman) – 7:06
 "Strong Culture" (Chandrasonic, Aniruddha Das, Steve Chandra Savale, Uddin, Zaman) – 6:44
 "TH9" (Chandrasonic, Aniruddha Das, Pandit G, Steve Chandra Savale, Thorpe, Zaman) – 5:25
 "Tu Meri" (Chandrasonic, Aniruddha Das, Pandit G, Steve Chandra Savale, Thorpe) – 4:57
 "Debris" (Chandrasonic, Aniruddha Das, Pandit G, Steve Chandra Savale, Zaman) – 4:18
 "Box" (Chandrasonic, Aniruddha Das, Pandit G, Steve Chandra Savale, Zaman) – 6:09
 "Thacid 9 (Dub Version)" (Chandrasonic, Aniruddha Das, Pandit G, Steve Chandra Savale) – 5:32
 "Return to Jericho (Dub Version)" (Chandrasonic, Aniruddha Das, Pandit G, Steve Chandra Savale) – 4:26

Personnel
The following personnel are credited to this album:

 Master D - Rap
 Bubbly - dancer
 Catalysa - slides  
 Chandrasonic - guitar, programming, voices, producer
 Dr Das - programming, bass, voice
 Pandit G - turntables
 Sun-J - sequencing
 Mr Maiquez - live mix
 Frederic Voisin - artwork, design

References

1995 debut albums
Asian Dub Foundation albums
Nation Records albums
Beggars Banquet Records albums